Kuibysheve is an urban-type settlement in the Bakhchysarai Raion of Crimea. Population: 

The town features in the Russian language novel, 'Serye Pychely' (translated into English as 'Grey Bees') by Ukrainian writer Andrey Kurkov, published in 2018 but set during the conflict of 2014.

References

External links
 

Bakhchysarai Raion
Urban-type settlements in Crimea